The 1977 Cam 2 Motor Oil 400 was a NASCAR Winston Cup Series race that was held on June 19, 1977, at Michigan International Speedway in Brooklyn, Michigan.

Background
Opened in 1968, the track's turns are banked at eighteen degrees, while the 3,600-foot-long front stretch, the location of the finish line, is banked at twelve degrees. The back stretch, has a five degree banking and is 2,242 feet long.

Race report
36 drivers started this 200-lap event; all of them were born in the United States of America. Bill Seifert would return after a five-year absence from NASCAR and recorded a12th-place finish.

Ferrel Harris was credited with the last-place finish due to difficulties with his engine on the ninth lap. Donnie Allison would be the highest place finisher not to finish the race; he acquired a similar problem on lap 176. Cale Yarborough would defeat Richard Petty by ten seconds. More than 61,000 fans would see nearly three hours of racing. Benny Parsons, Cale Yarborough, Richard Petty, and future NASCAR on FOX personality Darrell Waltrip would duel among each other for the lead early on in the race. Winnings for each driver varied from $20,625 for the race winner ($ when adjusted for inflation) to $1,300 for the last-place finisher ($ when adjusted for inflation).

The total prize purse of this race was $123,005 ($ when adjusted for inflation). Notable crew chiefs in the race were Buddy Parrott, Jake Elder, Joey Arrington, Kirk Shelmerdine, Dale Inman and Tim Brewer.

Janet Guthrie was the lone female competitor in this race. Richard Childress, then a driver/owner, competed in this race and finished in 35th place (after starting out in 8th place). County singer Marty Robbins made his first NASCAR Cup start in more than two years and turned in a solid top-15 performance. 

Roland Wlodyka made his NASCAR Cup debut but finished 29th after a transmission failure.

It was the first start as an owner for eventual Cup Series Champion Rod Osterlund.

Qualifying

Results

Standings after the race

References

Cam 2 Motor Oil 400
Cam 2 Motor Oil
NASCAR races at Michigan International Speedway